Three Blind Mice is a Japanese jazz record label founded in June 1970 as a showcase for Japan's emerging jazz performers.  More than 130 albums have been released since then. So far they have won the Jazz Disc Award five times in Japan.  Produced by Takeshi Fujii (producer) and often recorded by the Yoshihiko Kannari, TBM created jazz records by Japanese players since the 1970s and became known for its audiophile sound quality.  TBM's records captured a very important, vibrant era in the development of Japanese jazz. Stars like Isao Suzuki, Tsuyoshi Yamamoto, George Kawaguchi, Terumasa Hino and Mari Nakamoto recorded their very first albums with the label. Artists also include  Shuko Mizuno's "Jazz Orchestra '73", Toshiyuko Miyama and Masaru Imada.

Discography

TBM-1	Kosuke Mine Quintet	-Mine (LP) 1970	
TBM-2  Masaru Imada Quartet	-NOW! (LP) 1970	
TBM-3  Takao Uematsu Quartet/Quintet	-Debut (LP)  1970
TBM-4	Kosuke Mine Quintet	-2nd Album (LP)  1970
TBM-5  Albert Mangelsdorff Quartet	-Diggin' - Live At Dug, Tokyo (LP)  1971
TBM-6	Hideto Kanai Group -Q (LP) 
TBM-7	Allan Praskin Quartet	-Encounter (LP, Album)	1971
TBM-8	Kimiko Kasai With Kosuke Mine Quartet -Yellow Carcass In The Blue (LP)	1971
TBM-9	Masayuki Takayanagi & New Century Music Institute -Ginparis Session - June 26, 1963 (LP)	1971
TBM-10	New Direction For The Arts	-Free Form Suite (LP, Album)	1972
TBM-11 Toya Shigeko With The Imada Masaru Trio (LP) 1972
TBM-12 Sunao Wada Quartet/Sextet   -Coco's Blues' (LP) 1972
TBM-13 George Otsuka  Quintet      -Go On  (LP) 1972
TBM-14 Masaru Imada Solo/Trio      -Poppy  (LP) 1973
TBM-15 Isao Suzuki Trio/Quartet    -Blow Up  (LP)  1973
TBM-16 Shigeko Toya & Her Jazz Friends -Fine And Mellow  (LP) 1973
TBM-17	Terumasa Hino Quintet	-Live! (LP)	1973
TBM-18 Teruo Nakamura Group        -Unicorn  (LP) 1973
TBM-19 Hiroshi Fukumura Quintet    -Fukumura Hiroshi Quintet  (LP)  1973
TBM-20 Naosuka Miyamoto Sextet  -Step! (LP)  1973
TBM-21 Mari Nakamoto & Yasuro Osawa Trio+2 -Unforgettable (LP) 1973
TBM-22 Masaru Imada Trio & Shigeko Toya -Yokohama Concert (LP) 1973
TBM-23	Tsuyoshi Yamamoto Trio	-Midnight Sugar (LP)	1974
TBM-24 Isao Suzuki Quartet Plus One -Blue City (LP) 1974
TBM-25 Sunao Wada Quartet/Quintet -Blues World  (LP)  1974
TBM-26 Kunihiko Sugano Trio +1  -Love Is a Many Splendored Thing (LP) 1974
TBM-27 Kenji Mori, Hideo Ichikawa Trio  -Solo & Trio (LP)  1974
TBM-28 Takashi Mizuhashi Quartet+2 -When A Man Loves A Woman  (LP)  1974
TBM-29 Isao Suzuki & Sunao Wada plus Tsuyoshi Yamamoto Trio, George Otsuka Quintet+2 -Now's The Time (LP) 1974 
TBM-30 Tsuyoshi Yamamoto Trio -Misty (LP) 1974
TBM-31 Takashi Mizuhashi Quartet -Who Cares (LP) 1974
TBM-32 Toshiyuki Miyama & The New Herd -New Herd (LP) 1974
TBM-33 Mari Nakamoto With The Shoji Yokouchi And Yuri Tashiro -Little Girl Blue (LP) 1974
TBM-34 Kimiko Kasai With Kosuke Mine Quartet -Yellow Caracas In The Blue (LP) [RE:TBM-8] 1974
TBM-35 George Otsuka Trio -You Are My Sunshine (LP) 1974
TBM-36 Isao Suzuki Quartet+1 -All Right (LP) 1974
TBM-37 Tsuyoshi Yamamoto Trio -Live At The Misty (LP) 1974
TBM-38 Takashi Furuya Quintet -Solitude (LP) 1975
TBM-39	Masaru Imada + 2	-Green Caterpillar (LP, Wit)	1975
TBM-40 Yoshiko Goto With Takashi Mizuhashi Quartet -Day Dream (LP) 1975
TBM-41 Tsuyoshi Yamamoto Trio -Blues For Tee (LP) 1974
TBM-42 Masaru Imada Quartet -Now! (LP) 1970
TBM-43 Inaba & Nakamura Duo -Conversation (LP) 1975
TBM-44	Isao Suzuki Quartet + 2	-Oran-Utan (LP)	1975 
TBM-45 Hideto Kanai & Kings Roar Orchestra -Ode To Birds (LP) 1975
TBM-46 Hidefumi Toki Quartet -Toki (LP) 1975
TBM-47 Masaru Imada Trio -One For Duke (LP) 1975
TBM-48 Toshiyuki Miyama And The New Herd Orchestra -Take The A Train (LP) 1975
TBM-49 Sunao Wada Quintet / Hitomi Ueda / Ushio Sakai Trio -Blues For Bird (LP) 1975
TBM-50 Sanae Mizushima -You've Got A Friend (LP) 1975
TBM-51 Yoshio Otomo / Hidefumi Toki - Alto Madness -Lover Man (LP) 1975
TBM-52 Tsuyoshi Yamamoto Trio -The In Crowd (LP) 1974
TBM-53 Seiichi Nakamura Trio/Quintet -Adventure In My Dream (LP) 1975
TBM-54 Yoshiko Goto With Inaba & Nakamure Duo -A Touch Of Love (LP) 1975
TBM-55	Toshiyuki Miyama & The New Herd Plus All-Star Guests*	Shuko Mizuno's -"Jazz Orchestra '73" (LP)	1973
TBM-56 Mari Nakamoto With Isao Suzuki & Kazumi Watanabe Duo -Mari Nakamoto III (LP) 1975
TBM-57 Isao Suzuki & His Fellows -Touch (LP) 1975
TBM-58 Koji Moriyama With The Tsuyoshi Yamamoto Trio -Night And Day (LP) 1975
TBM-59 Tsuyoshi Yamamoto Trio  -Yama & Jiro's Wave -Girl Talk (LP) 1975
TBM-60 Masaru Imada -Masaru Imada Piano (LP) 1975
TBM-61 Motohiko Hino Quartet + 1	"Ryuhyo" - Sailing Ice (LP)	1976
TBM-62 George Otsuka Quintet -Physical Structure (LP) 1976
TBM-63 Isao Suzuki Trio -Black Orpheus (LP) 1976
TBM-64 Toshio Oida -It Was A Very Good Year (LP) 1976
TBM-65 Shoji Yokouchi Quartet -Blonde On The Rocks (LP) 1976
TBM-66 George Kawaguchi's The Big 4 -The Big 4 (LP) 1976
TBM-67	Toshiyuki Miyama & The New Herd -Sunday Thing (LP)	1976
TBM-68 Tatsuya Takahasi & The Tokyo Union -Got The Spirit (LP) 1976
TBM-69 Tsuyoshi Yamamoto Trio -Summertime (LP) 1976
TBM-70 Toshiyuki Miyama & The New Herd -The World Of Shuko Mizuno (LP) 1976
TBM-71 Shigeko Toya, Mari Nakamoto With The Tsuyoshi Yamamoto Trio -Shigeo & Mari (LP) 1976
TBM-72 Kunio Ohta Quartet+1 -Free And Lovely (LP) 1976
TBM-73 Hideo Ichikawa Trio -Tomorrow (LP) 1976
TBM-74 Hidehiko Matsumoto Quartet -Sleepy (LP) 1976
TBM-75 Sunao Wada Quintet+1 -Four Scenes (LP) 1976
TBM-76 Isao Suzuki Sextet -Ako's Dream (LP) 1976
TBM-77 Masaru Imada Trio -Standards (LP) 1976
TBM-78 Isoo Fukui Quartet -Sunrise Sunset (LP) 1976
TBM-1001 Toshiyuki Miyama & The New Herd Plus All-Star Guests*	Shuko Mizuno's -"Jazz Orchestra '73" (LP)[RE:TBM-55]	1973
TBM-1002.3 George Otsuka Quintet -In Concert (2LP) 1973
TBM-1004 Toshiyuki Miyama & The New Herd + All Star Guests]] -Shuko Mizuno's Jazz Orchestra '75" (LP) 1975
TBM-1005 Tatsuya Takahashi and The Tokyo Union + 3 -Scandinavian Suite (LP) 1977
TBM-3001 Tatsuya Takahashi and The Tokyo Union -Maiden Voyage (LP) 1976
TBM-3002 Kunio Ohta Quintet -My Back Page (LP) 1976
TBM-3003 Kenji Mori Quartet -Firebird (LP) 1977
TBM-3004 Fumio Karashima Trio -Gathering (LP) 1977
TBM-3005 Mari Nakamoto With Shoji Yokouchi Trio/Sextet -Mari (LP) 1977
TBM-3006 Yuji Imamura & Air (6)	-Air (LP)	1977
TBM-3007 Yoshio Otomo Quartet -Moon Ray (LP) 1977
TBM-3008 Ayako Hosokawa With Tsuyoshi Yamamoto And The Strings -Mr. Wonderful (LP) 1977
TBM-3009 Tsuyoshi Yamamoto With The Strings -Star Dust (LP) 1977
TBM-4001 Jimmy, Yoko & Shin -Sei Shonagon (LP)	1978
TBM-4002 Window Pane -Window Pane (LP)	1978
TBM-5001 Sunao Wada Quartet Featuring Isao Suzuki And Masaru Imada -Blues-Blues-Blues (LP)	1977
TBM-5002 Koji Moriyama + Tsuyoshi Yamamoto Trio -Smile (LP)	1977
TBM-5003 Masaru Imada & George Mraz -Alone Together (LP)	1977
TBM-5004	Tee & Company	-Sonnet (LP)	1977
TBM-5005 Ayako Hosokawa With The Masaru Imada Quartet -No Tears (LP) 1977
TBM-5006 Tee & Company - Dragon Garden (LP)  1977
TBM-5007 Masaru Imada Quartet -Remember Of Love (LP) 1978
TBM-5008	Tee & Company	-Spanish Flower (LP)	1977
TBM-5009 Tsuyoshi Yamamoto Trio - Midnight Sun (LP) 	1978
TBM 5010	Bingo Miki & Inner Galaxy Orchestra (LP) 	1978
TBM-5011 Shoji Yokouchi Trio Plus Yuri Tashiro - Greensleeves (LP)	1978
TBM-5012 Hideto Kanai Quintet - Concierto De Aranjuez (LP)	1978
TBM-5013 Ayako Hosokawa With T. Miyama & The New Herd - Call Me (LP)	1979
TBM(P)-5014 Hidehiko Matsumoto Quartet - Samba De Sun (LP)	1979
TBM(P)-5015 Hideto Kanai Quintet - What (LP)	1979
TBM(P)-5016 Toshiyuki Miyama & The New Herd - Gallery (LP)	1979
TBM(P)-5018 Jojo Takayanagi Second Concept - Cool Jojo (LP)	1980
TBM(P)-5019 Tsuyoshi Yamamoto Trio -Live in Montreux (LP)
TBM(P)-5020 Mari Nakamoto - What A Difference A Day Made (LP)	1980
TBM(P)-5022 Zap - Oh! Sunshine (LP)	1980
TBM(P)-5023 New Direction Unit - Live At Moers Festival (LP) 	1980
PAP-25022 Eiji Nakayama With Masaru Imada - North Plain (LP)	1982
PAP-25030 Masayuki "Jojo" Takayanagi - Lonely Woman (LP)	1982
PAP-25036 Martha Miyake - Remember (LP)	1982
PAP-25042 Toshio Ohsumi Trio Featuring Hiromu Aoki  - Watermelon Man (LP)	1983
TBM-CD-5031 Yoshiyuki Yamanaka Quintet + 2 - Peggy's Blue Skylight (CD)	1988
TBM-CD-5032 Takayuki Kato Trio - Guitar Music  (CD)	1989
TBM-CD-5033 Mikinori Fujiwara Quartet + 1 - Touch Spring  (CD)	1990
TBM-CD-5034 Sachi Hayakawa & Stir Up  - Straight to the Core  (CD)	1990
TBM-CD-5037 Shunzo Ohno  - Maya (CD)	1992
TBM-CD-5038 Mikinori Fujiwara Group - Wild Rose (CD)	 1993
TBM-CD-5039 Ayako Hosokawa  - A Whisper Of Love (CD)	1993
TBM-CD-5040 Ushio Sakai - Blues Meeting (CD)	1994
TBM-XR-5041 Takayuki Kato Trio - Guitar Standards  (CD)	2001
TBM-XR-5043 Toshiyuki Akamatsu  - Six Intentions (CD)	2002
TBM-XR-5044 Eiji Nakayama Group with Masaru Imada  - North Plain (CD) [RE:PAP-25022]	2003
TBM-XR-5045 Martha Miyake  - Remember (CD) 2003 [RE:PAP-25036]	2003
TBM-XR-5046 Toshiyuki Akamatsu  - Still On The Air (CD)	2002
TBM-CD-1885 Tee & Company - OKUNI OF IZUMO (CD)	2003
TBM-CD-1889 Duke Jordan - So Nice Duke (CD)	2002
TBM-CD-1890 Takayuki Kato - Synapse (CD)	2004
TBM-CD-2842 Takeshi Kamachi -Spread   (CD)	2002
TBM-CD-9001 The Famous Sound Of Three Blind Mice vol. 1
TBM-CD-9002 The Famous Sound Of Three Blind Mice vol. 2
TBM-CD-9003 The Famous Sound Of Three Blind Mice vol. 3
NKCD-1486 Mayumi Lowe -It's My Love (CD)	2004

References
Minor, William. Jazz Journeys to Japan. University of Michigan Press, 2004. 
Gerard, Charley. Jazz in Black and White. University of Michigan Press 1998.

Japanese record labels
Jazz record labels